Bridon Ropes Football Club is a football club based in Charlton, Royal Borough of Greenwich, England.

History
The club was established in 1935 as a works team of the British Ropes factory in Charlton. The club initially played in local leagues, before becoming members of the South London Amateur League. In 1970 the club joined Division Two of the Greater London League, which was largely composed of reserve teams. However, the league was disbanded at the end of the 1970–71 season when it merged into the Metropolitan–London League.

In 1975 they joined the Intermediate Division of the London Spartan League. In 1990 the club was renamed Bridon Sports after the company was renamed Bridon Ropes. The division was renamed Division Two in 1991, and the following year the club changed name again, this time becoming Bridon Ropes. They went on to win the Division Two title and the Kent Junior Cup in 1992–93, earning promotion to Division One. In 1997 the Spartan League merged with the South Midlands League to form the Spartan South Midlands League, with Bridon placed in Division One South. However, after one season they left the league to become founder members of the London Intermediate League. The club subsequently won the League Cup in 1999–2000 and 2000–01.

In 2003 Bridon joined Division Two West of the Kent County League. After finishing as runners-up in 2005–06, they were promoted to Division One West. They went on to win the division in 2009–10 and were promoted to the Premier Division. In 2011 they were founder members of the Kent Invicta League. In 2013–14 the club won the London Senior Trophy, beating Corinthian-Casuals 2–1 in the final, after extra time. In 2016 the Kent Invicta League became Division One of the Southern Counties East League when the two leagues merged.

Ground
Bridon Ropes play their home games at Meridian Sports & Social Club on Charlton Park Lane.

Honours
Spartan League
Division Two champions 1991–92
Kent County League
Division One West champions 2009–10
London Intermediate League
League Cup winners 1999–2000, 2000–01
London Senior Trophy
Winners 2013–14
Kent Junior Cup
Winners 1992–93

Records
Best FA Cup performance: Extra-preliminary round, 2016–17
Best FA Vase performance: First round, 2015–16, 2016–17

References

External links

Football clubs in England
Football clubs in London
Sport in the Royal Borough of Greenwich
Association football clubs established in 1935
1935 establishments in England
Greater London League
Spartan League
Spartan South Midlands Football League
Kent County League
Kent Invicta Football League
Southern Counties East Football League
Works association football teams in England